Dixonville may refer to one of the following places:

Dixonville, Alabama
Dixonville, Alberta
Dixonville, Pennsylvania